Stag at Sharkey's is a 1909 oil painting by George Wesley Bellows depicting two boxers fighting in the private athletic club situated across from his studio. It is part of the Ashcan School movement known in particular for depicting scenes of daily life in  early twentieth century New York City, often in the city's poorer neighborhoods. Participants in the boxing ring were usually members of the club, but occasionally outsiders would fight with temporary memberships. These fighters were known as "stags".

Description
Bellows used quick strokes to create a blurred image, simulating the two fighters in motion. He also chose a low point of view to put the viewer among the crowd watching the fight. He chooses "expressive involvement" in the action. He said: "I don't know anything about boxing, I'm just  painting two men trying to kill each other."

History
He painted the work in August 1909, as a part of a boxing series. The painting has been a part of the Cleveland Museum of Art's permanent collection since 1922. He also created a lithograph of the scene, in 1917.

References

Modern paintings
1909 paintings
Paintings in the collection of the Cleveland Museum of Art
Paintings by George Bellows
Boxing in art
Sports paintings